Değirmencik is a village located in the Nusaybin District of the Mardin Province in Turkey. The village is located ca.  northeast of Nusaybin and is unpopulated.

History 
The village was populated by Kurds from the Dasikan tribe. The village was Yazidi.

Population

References 

Villages in Nusaybin District
Tur Abdin
Yazidi villages in Turkey
Kurdish settlements in Mardin Province
Unpopulated villages in Turkey